Rubritrochus is a genus of sea snails, marine gastropod mollusks in the subfamily Trochinae of the family Trochidae, the top snails.

Species
Species within the genus Rubritrochus include:
 † Rubritrochus africanus Harzhauser, 2009 
 Rubritrochus andamanensis Dekker, 2018
 † Rubritrochus bonneti (Cossmann, 1910) 
 Rubritrochus declivis (Forskål, 1775)
 Rubritrochus ellenae Dekker, 2018
 Rubritrochus lagerweijae Dekker, 2018
 Rubritrochus moolenbeeki Dekker, 2018
 † Rubritrochus pachyozodes (Cossmann, 1910) 
 Rubritrochus pulcherrimus (A. Adams, 1855)
 Rubritrochus simoni Dekker, 2018

References

 Beck L.A. (1995) Rubritrochus, a new genus name for Gibbula pulcherrima A. Adams 1855 and Gibbula declivis (Forskal 1775). Archiv für Molluskenkunde 124(1-2): 65-85
 Dekker H. (2018). A note on the genus Rubritrochus (Gastropoda, Vetigastropoda, Trochidae), with descriptions of five new species. Basteria. 82(1-3): 1-14.

 
Trochidae
Gastropod genera